Joseph Hipkins House, also known as Jas. T. Howland House, is a historic home located at La Grange, Lewis County, Missouri. It was built about 1856, and is a two-story, three bay, side hall plan, brick I-house with Greek Revival style design elements.  It has a one-story brick rear ell.  The house has a low hipped roof with a wide overhang and a deep wooden cornice and features a full-width front porch and wide formal entranceways.

It was listed on the National Register of Historic Places in 2008.

References

Houses on the National Register of Historic Places in Missouri
Greek Revival houses in Missouri
Houses completed in 1856
Buildings and structures in Lewis County, Missouri
National Register of Historic Places in Lewis County, Missouri